"Generational Divide" is a song by American rock band, Blink-182. The song was released on June 21, 2019 through Columbia Records, as the second single from the band's eighth studio album, Nine. It was written by bassist Mark Hoppus, drummer Travis Barker, and guitarist Matt Skiba, as well as producer John Feldmann, and songwriters Benjamin Berger, Ryan McMahon, and Ryan Rabin.

Background
Unlike the band's previous single, "Blame It On My Youth", "Generational Divide" uses a noticeably more aggressive and darker tone, while also being much shorter than most of the band's previous singles.

The song is based on an argument Hoppus had with his son when driving him to the bus stop one morning before school. Afterwards, he went to the studio and wrote "Generational Divide" based on the fight. The theme of the song was "nothing changes if nothing changes." In an interview with Kat Corbett at SiriusXM's Lithium, Hoppus also explained that the song's brief length was the result of it being trimmed from a three-minute song preceding it. Initially, "Generational Divide" was a longer song with a very different structure: it shifted between three-quarter time and four-quarter time, which Hoppus described as reminiscent of the Beatles' "She's Leaving Home". In the end, the group preferred the snippet towards its conclusion where it grew faster, and simply decided to clip that portion off and release it.

Release and reception
Many critics noted that the song was particularly short, but also praised it for the more aggressive direction. Jon Blistein of Rolling Stone felt that the song "is a burst driving guitars and hardcore drums", while Chad Childers at Loudwire called it "a 'blink and you might miss it' cut". Additionally, Collin Goeman from Alternative Press pointed out Travis Barker's previous promises of returning to a sound more akin to the band's untitled album, calling it a "perfect illustration" of the statements.

Many fans speculated that the band released the song as a single in response to the backlash that "Blame It On My Youth" received from their fanbase. Hoppus denied these accusations, stating that "Generational Divide" had been written six months prior to "Blame It On My Youth".

Music video
The music video was directed by Kevin Kerslake, and released on the same day as the song. It depicts the band playing in a small room with the walls, floor, and ceiling plastered with concert flyers from other notable punk rock acts, including but not limited to: Bad Brains, Bad Religion, Descendents, The Misfits, Iggy Pop, Meat Puppets, Melvins, Motörhead, Fugazi, Cro-Mags, The Vandals, G.B.H., Youth of Today and Nirvana.

Track listing
 Digital download

 "Generational Divide" – 0:49

Personnel
Blink-182
 Mark Hoppus – vocals, bass guitar, songwriting
 Matt Skiba – vocals, guitars, songwriting
 Travis Barker – drums, percussion, songwriting

Production

 John Feldmann – producer, songwriting
 Benjamin Berger – songwriting
 Ryan McMahon – songwriting
 Ryan Rabin – songwriting
 Scott Stewart - assistant engineer
 Dylan McLean - assistant engineer
 KT Pipal - assistant engineer
 Rich Costey - mixing
 Chris Athens – mastering engineer

References

2019 singles
2019 songs
Blink-182 songs
Songs written by Mark Hoppus
Songs written by Matt Skiba
Songs written by Travis Barker
Songs written by John Feldmann
Songs written by Ryan McMahon (record producer)
Music videos directed by Kevin Kerslake